The 2016–17 Incarnate Word Cardinals men's basketball team represented the University of the Incarnate Word during the 2016–17 NCAA Division I men's basketball season. The Cardinals were led by 11th-year head coach Ken Burmeister and played their home games at McDermott Convocation Center in San Antonio, Texas as members of the Southland Conference. They finished the season 12–17, 7–11 in Southland play to finish in a five-way tie for eighth place.

The 2016–17 season was the final year of a four-year transitional period for Incarnate Word from Division II to Division I. During year four, the Cardinals played a normal conference schedule. They were Division I for scheduling purposes and were also considered as a Division I RPI member. They could not participate in the conference tournament until the 2017–18 season at which time they will also be able to participate in the NCAA tournament.

Previous season
The Cardinals finished the 2015–16 season 16–12, 11–6 in Southland play to finish in a tie for third place.

Roster

Schedule and results

|-
!colspan=9 style=| Non-Conference regular season

|-
!colspan=9 style=| Southland regular season
|-

See also
2016–17 Incarnate Word Cardinals women's basketball team

References

Incarnate Word Cardinals men's basketball seasons
Incarnate Word
Incarnate Word Cardinals men's basketball
Incarnate Word Cardinals men's basketball